Geoff Collyer (born 1958) is a Canadian computer scientist. He is the senior author of C News, a protocol-neutral news transport, and the designer of NOV, the News Overview database (article index) used by all modern newsreaders. He contributed the code that allowed to convert the Bourne Shell from using the non-portable sbrk to a portable malloc based implementation. In the past he worked as a Unix system programmer, but since 1994 he has been living on Plan 9 while working at Bell Laboratories.

Honors 
Asteroid 129101 Geoffcollyer, discovered by astronomers at the Jarnac Observatory in Arizona in 2004, was named in his honor. The official  was published by the Minor Planet Center on 9 August 2006.

References

External links 
 Geoff Collyers Homepage with publications
 modified V7 shell source
 modified V9 shell source
 recent Plan 9 kernel source
 Geoff Collyer and Henry Spencer (1987). News Need Not Be Slow.
 Mark Linimon (1994). C News Frequently Asked Questions.
 C News source code

 

1958 births
Living people
Usenet people
Plan 9 people